Calvary Episcopal Church and Churchyard is a historic Episcopal church located at 411 E. Church Street in Tarboro, Edgecombe County, North Carolina. The church was built between 1860 and 1867, and is a one-story, rectangular Gothic Revival style building.  Attached to the church is a Parish House built in 1922, and designed by architect Hobart Upjohn.  Located adjacent to the church is an arboretum dating to 1842, that includes number of gravestones.  Notable burials include Gen. William Dorsey Pender (1834–1863) and author William L. Saunders (1835–1891).

It was listed on the National Register of Historic Places in 1971. It is located in the Tarboro Historic District.

References

Episcopal church buildings in North Carolina
Churches in Tarboro, North Carolina
Cemeteries in North Carolina
Churches on the National Register of Historic Places in North Carolina
Gothic Revival church buildings in North Carolina
Churches completed in 1867
19th-century Episcopal church buildings
National Register of Historic Places in Edgecombe County, North Carolina
Individually listed contributing properties to historic districts on the National Register in North Carolina